The Marais breton (or Marais breton-vendéen, "Breton Marsh") is a zone géographique humide (humid geographic zone) along France's Atlantic coast. It marks the border between two traditional French provinces, Brittany and Poitou, and extends between two French departments, Loire-Atlantique and Vendée, both of which included in the administrative region of Pays de la Loire.

The Marais breton is protected by levees and dunes, stabilized by the pines of the forest of Pays de Monts. Some areas, such as Bouin are below sea level and were once subject to storm surges. A valve system blocking salt water from entering portions of the marsh was also developed to accommodate the marsh waters to agriculture.

Culture 
The Marais Breton has a tradition of music and dance similar to its neighbors the Bocage vendéen and Upper Brittany, but it also has its own local instrument, the veuze bagpipe, and its own dance, the Maraîchine.

Fauna and flora
Per the Natura 2000, the Marais breton is part of a larger geographic cadre which also include the forêt des Pays de Monts, the Bay of Bourgneuf, and the île de Noirmoutier.

See also 
 Marais poitevin

References

External links 
 écomusée du Marais breton
 Le site de l'Association pour le Développement du Bassin Versant de la Baie de Bourgneuf

Breton
Landforms of Loire-Atlantique
Landforms of Vendée
Landforms of Pays de la Loire
Ramsar sites in Metropolitan France
Brittany region articles needing translation from French Wikipedia